Bridgend is a constituency represented in the House of Commons of the UK Parliament since 2019 by Jamie Wallis, a Conservative.

Constituency profile
The seat covers Bridgend itself and some of the south Wales coast to the west including the seaside resort of Porthcawl. Levels of wealth and education are around average for the UK.

Boundaries

1983–1997: The Borough of Ogwr wards numbers 1, 2, 12 to 16, 18, and 20 to 23.

1997–2010: The Borough of Ogwr wards of Brackla, Cefn Cribwr, Coity Higher, Cornelly, Coychurch Lower, Laleston, Morfa, Newcastle, Newcastle Higher, Oldcastle, Porthcawl East, Porthcawl West, Pyle, and St Bride's Major.

2010–present: The Bridgend County Borough electoral divisions of Brackla; Bryntirion, Laleston and Merthyr Mawr; Cefn Glas; Coity; Cornelly; Coychurch Lower; Litchard; Llangewydd and Brynhyfryd; Morfa; Newcastle; Newton; Nottage; Oldcastle; Pendre; Pen-y-fai; Porthcawl East Central; Porthcawl West Central; Pyle; and Rest Bay.

History
Summary of results
The 2015 result gave the seat the 19th-smallest majority of Labour's 232 seats by percentage of majority. The Bridgend constituency was created in 1983 from parts of the seats of Ogmore & Aberavon. To date, it has mostly voted for candidates from the Labour Party at general elections. The exceptions have been the Conservatives winning the seat at the 1983 'landslide' election, and in 2019. An absolute Labour majority occurred in Bridgend in three successive elections: 1992, 1997 and 2001, as well as in 2017.

Other opposition parties
Since 2001, inclusive, two non-Labour, non-Conservative candidates at each election have kept their deposits, winning greater than or equal to 5% of the vote.

Turnout
Turnout has ranged between a high of 80.5%, in 1992, and a low of 59.2% in 2005.

Members of Parliament

Elections

Elections in the 1980s

Elections in the 1990s

Elections in the 2000s

Elections in the 2010s

Of the 63 rejected ballots:
43 were either unmarked or it was uncertain who the vote was for.
18 voted for more than one candidate.
2 had writing or mark by which the voter could be identified.

Of the 55 rejected ballots:
36 were either unmarked or it was uncertain who the vote was for.
19 voted for more than one candidate.

Of the 101 rejected ballots:
78 were either unmarked or it was uncertain who the vote was for.
23 voted for more than one candidate.

See also
 Bridgend (Senedd constituency)
 List of parliamentary constituencies in Mid Glamorgan
 List of parliamentary constituencies in Wales

Notes

References

External links 
nomis Constituency Profile for Bridgend — presenting data from the ONS annual population survey and other official statistics.
Politics Resources (Election results from 1922 onwards)
Electoral Calculus (Election results from 1955 onwards)
2017 Election House Of Commons Library 2017 Election report
A Vision Of Britain Through Time (Constituency elector numbers)

Parliamentary constituencies in South Wales
Constituencies of the Parliament of the United Kingdom established in 1983
Politics of Bridgend County Borough
Mid Glamorgan